The 1981 Cincinnati Bengals season was the franchise's 12th season in the National Football League (NFL), and the 14th overall. The team won their first AFC Championship, but lost Super Bowl XVI to San Francisco.

Cincinnati had at least a share of the AFC Central lead the entire season. On December 13, quarterback Ken Anderson threw two touchdown passes as the Bengals clinched the division with a 17–10 win over the Pittsburgh Steelers, the Bengals' only other rival for the division title by that point in the season.

Ken Anderson led the NFL in passing in 1981 with a 98.5 rating.

On January 3, 1982, the Bengals beat Buffalo, 28–21, in an AFC divisional playoff game. A week later, playing in their first AFC Championship Game, the Bengals defeated San Diego, 27–7, at Riverfront Stadium in a temperature of nine degrees below zero with a wind-chill factor of minus-59. This game is referred to as the Freezer Bowl.

In Super Bowl XVI on January 24, 1982, in Pontiac, Michigan, the Bengals trailed 20–0 at halftime and lost to San Francisco, 26–21.

Offseason
Before the season, the Bengals unveiled new uniforms with tiger-striped helmets, jerseys and pants.

NFL Draft

Personnel

Staff

Roster

Regular season

Schedule

Game summaries

Week 1

Week 2

Week 3

Week 4

Week 5

Week 6

Week 7

Week 8

Week 9

Week 10

Week 11

Week 12

Week 13

Pete Johnson 21 Rush, 105 Yds

Week 14

Week 15

Week 16

Playoffs

Divisional

Conference Championship

Super Bowl

Standings

Awards and records
 Ken Anderson, NFL MVP
 Ken Anderson, Bert Bell Award
 Ken Anderson, Franchise Record (since broken), Touchdown Passes, 29 Passes 
 Ken Anderson, Led NFL, Passer Rating, 98.4 Rating

Milestones
 Ken Anderson, Franchise Record (since broken), Most Touchdown Passes in One Season, 29 Passes 
 Cris Collinsworth, 1st 1,000 Yard Receiving Season (1,009 yards) 
 Pete Johnson, 1,000 Yard Rushing Season (1,077 yards)

References

External links
 1981 Cincinnati Bengals at Pro-Football-Reference.com

Cincinnati Bengals
American Football Conference championship seasons
Cincinnati Bengals seasons
AFC Central championship seasons
Cinc